The 2017 IAAF World Indoor Tour was the second edition of the IAAF World Indoor Tour, the highest level of annual series of track and field indoor meetings. It was designed to create an IAAF Diamond League-style circuit for indoor track and field events, to raise the profile of indoor track and field athletics.

Announced with initially four events for 2016, three in Europe and one in the United States, leading to the 2016 IAAF World Indoor Championships in Portland, Oregon, the second edition contained 5 meetings, and took place in a year with no World Indoor championships; therefore qualification places were not applicable.  The Globen Galan was removed from this year's series, and the Stockholm leg was replaced by the International Copernicus Cup, a long-standing indoor event in Torún, Poland for 2017. The PSD Bank Meeting in Düsseldorf was also added, while the Birmingham Indoor Grand Prix returned to its traditional home, having been in Glasgow in 2016.

Meetings
For the 2017 edition, the Stockholm meeting was removed, and two further meetings added. In addition, as part of a long-term agreement alternating venues of the Great Britain leg, the Glasgow Indoor Grand Prix moved to Birmingham, England.

Scoring system
At each meeting a minimum of 12 events were staged. Included in the 12 events will be a core group of five or six events split across the two-season cycle.

Tour events for 2016 were the men's 60m, 800m, 3000/5000m, pole vault, triple jump and shot put, plus the women's 400m, 1500m, 60m hurdles, high jump and long jump.

Points were allocated to the best four athletes in each event, with the winner getting 10 points, the runner up receiving seven points, the third-placed finisher getting five points and the athlete in fourth receiving three points.

The individual overall winner of each event received US$20,000 in prize money.

Indoor Tour Events

The following events were core Tour events for the 2017 indoor season:

Men

 400 metres
 1500 metres
 60 metre hurdles
 High jump
 Long jump

 Women

60 metres
800 metres
3000 metres
Pole vault
Triple jump
Shot put

Results

Men's track

Men's field

Women's track

Women's field

Final 2017 World Indoor Tour standings

Men

Women

References

World Athletics Indoor Tour
World Indoor Tour